Giancarlo Luzzani (12 May 1912 – 3 November 1991) was a Swiss field hockey player who competed in the 1936 Summer Olympics. In 1936 he was a member of the Swiss team which was eliminated in the group stage of the Olympic tournament. He played one match as halfback.

External links
 

1912 births
1991 deaths
Swiss male field hockey players
Olympic field hockey players of Switzerland
Field hockey players at the 1936 Summer Olympics